Cedric Delon Smith (born May 27, 1968) is an American former college and professional football player who was a running back in the National Football League (NFL) for six seasons during the 1990s. Smith played college football for the University of Florida, and thereafter, he played professionally for the Minnesota Vikings, New Orleans Saints, Washington Redskins and Arizona Cardinals of the NFL. Smith was an assistant strength & conditioning coach with the Denver Broncos from 2017 to 2020. He is currently the Head Assistant Strength and Conditioning Coach of the Dallas Cowboys. He is entering his 15th season as an NFL strength and conditioning coach, Smith has seven years of experience leading the strength and conditioning programs for the Houston Texans (2010–13) and Kansas City Chiefs (2007–09).

Early years

Smith was born in Enterprise, Alabama in 1968.  He attended Enterprise High School, where he was an honor student and standout running back for the Enterprise Wildcats high school football team.

College career

Smith accepted an athletic scholarship to attend the University of Florida in Gainesville, Florida, where he played fullback for coach Galen Hall's Florida Gators football team from 1986 to 1989.  He was the primary blocking back for featured tailback Emmitt Smith in 1987, 1988 and 1989, and was also a team captain as a senior in 1989.  Smith was recognized as a Southeastern Conference (SEC) Academic Honor Roll honoree in 1987, 1988 and 1989, and he graduated with a bachelor's degree in public health in 1990.

Professional career

Smith played for the New Orleans Saints in 

In his six-season NFL career, Smith played in 72 games, and started 14 of them. He totaled 40 rushes for 100 yards with two touchdowns to go along with 20 receptions for 141 yards and two scores.

Coaching career

Smith is currently Head assistant strength and conditioning coach for the Dallas Cowboys, having spent the previous four seasons as an assistant with the Denver Broncos, three seasons directing the Kansas City Chiefs and four seasons directing the Houston Texans as head strength and conditioning coach. Smith was recognized as the NFL Strength and Conditioning Coach of the Year by the league’s strength and conditioning coaches in 2012.

See also 

 Florida Gators football, 1980–89
 List of Florida Gators in the NFL Draft
 List of New Orleans Saints players
 List of University of Florida alumni
 List of Washington Redskins players

References

Bibliography 

 Carlson, Norm, University of Florida Football Vault: The History of the Florida Gators, Whitman Publishing, LLC, Atlanta, Georgia (2007).  .
 Golenbock, Peter, Go Gators!  An Oral History of Florida's Pursuit of Gridiron Glory, Legends Publishing, LLC, St. Petersburg, Florida (2002).  .
 Hairston, Jack, Tales from the Gator Swamp: A Collection of the Greatest Gator Stories Ever Told, Sports Publishing, LLC, Champaign, Illinois (2002).  .
 McCarthy, Kevin M.,  Fightin' Gators: A History of University of Florida Football, Arcadia Publishing, Mount Pleasant, South Carolina (2000).  .
 Nash, Noel, ed., The Gainesville Sun Presents The Greatest Moments in Florida Gators Football, Sports Publishing, Inc., Champaign, Illinois (1998).  .

1968 births
Living people
People from Enterprise, Alabama
Players of American football from Alabama
American football running backs
Florida Gators football players
Minnesota Vikings players
New Orleans Saints players
Washington Redskins players
Arizona Cardinals players
Coaches of American football from Alabama
Denver Broncos coaches
Kansas City Chiefs
Houston Texans coaches